Joseph Brackenbury (1788–1864), was an English poet.

Biography
Brackenbury was born in 1788 at Langton, Lincolnshire, where he spent his early years. On 28 October 1808 he enrolled at Corpus Christi College, Cambridge. In 1810 he published his Natale Solum and other Poetical Pieces by subscription. In 1811 he graduated B.A.; in 1812 he became chaplain to the Madras establishment, and returning after some years' service proceeded M.A. in 1819. From 1828 to 1856 he was chaplain and secretary to the Magdalen Hospital, Blackfriars Road, London. In 1862 he became rector of Quendon, Essex, and died there, of heart disease, on 31 March 1864, aged 76.

References

1788 births
1864 deaths
19th-century English poets
People from East Lindsey District
Alumni of Corpus Christi College, Cambridge
English chaplains
Christian chaplains
English Christian religious leaders
English male poets
19th-century English male writers